Tan Kiat How (born 1977) is a Singaporean politician and former civil servant who has been serving as Senior Minister of State for National Development and Senior Minister of State for Communications and Information concurrently since 2022. A member of the governing People's Action Party (PAP), he has been the Member of Parliament (MP) representing the Kampong Chai Chee division of East Coast GRC since 2020.

Prior to his appointment as Senior Minister of State, he served as Minister of State for National Development, Minister of State for Communications and Information and Minister of State in the Prime Minister's Office between 2020 and 2021. 

A computer engineer by profession, Tan had worked at the Ministry of Communications and Information (MCI) and was the chief executive officer of the Infocomm Media Development Authority (IMDA). 

He made his political debut in the 2020 general election when he joined a five-member PAP team contesting in East Coast GRC, and they won with 53.39% of the vote. Tan was appointed Minister of State shortly after being elected, and appointed to the Prime Minister's Office from 2020 to 2021. In 2022, Tan was promoted Senior Minister of State after a Cabinet reshuffle.

Education 
Tan was educated at Hwa Chong Junior College before he went to the University of Illinois to study computer engineering and economics. He also completed a master's degree in management at Stanford University and was a Mason Fellow at Harvard University's John F. Kennedy School of Government.

Career 
A computer engineer by profession, Tan had worked at the Ministry of Communications and Information, where he served as Deputy Secretary (Cyber and Technology) and helped to develop the Intelligent Nation 2015 blueprint. He was also the Chief Executive Officer of the Infocomm Media Development Authority (IMDA) from January 2017 to June 2020. During his tenure, the IMDA awarded spectrum for the deployment of fifth-generation mobile networks and established the SG Digital Office in May 2020.

Political career 
Tan was announced as a People's Action Party (PAP) candidate contesting as part of a five-member PAP team in East Coast GRC during the 2020 general election. On 10 July 2020, the PAP team in East Coast GRC won with 53.39% of the vote against the Workers' Party so Tan became a Member of Parliament representing the Kampong Chai Chee ward of East Coast GRC.

On 27 July 2020, Tan was appointed Minister of State at the Prime Minister's Office and Ministry of National Development. On 15 May 2021, he was transferred from the Prime Minister's Office to the Ministry of Communications and Information, while continuing to concurrently serve at the Ministry of National Development. Tan was promoted Senior Minister of State on 13 June 2022 while serving both portfolios of Communications and Information and National Development.

Personal life 
Tan is married and has a child. On 3 February 2022, Tan revealed he tested positive for COVID-19, along with his wife a day before.

References

External links 
 Tan Kiat How on Parliament of Singapore

Living people
University of Illinois Urbana-Champaign alumni
Stanford University alumni
Harvard Kennedy School alumni
People's Action Party politicians
1977 births
Members of the Parliament of Singapore
Mason Fellows